(Set This) World Ablaze is the first live album by American metalcore band Killswitch Engage. The DVD is of a live show that was taped at The Palladium in Worcester, Massachusetts, United States, on July 25, 2005. It includes live tracks from Killswitch Engage, Alive or Just Breathing and The End of Heartache. Set This World Ablaze is the only Killswitch Engage media to have a Parental Advisory logo.

On August 4, 2006, (Set This) World Ablaze has been certified gold by the Recording Industry Association of America (RIAA).

Track listing

Music videos
 "Life to Lifeless"
 "My Last Serenade"
 "Fixation on the Darkness"
 "Rose of Sharyn"
 "The End of Heartache"

Personnel
Killswitch Engage
Adam Dutkiewicz – lead guitar, backing vocals
Joel Stroetzel – rhythm guitar
Mike D'Antonio – bass, artwork
Howard Jones – lead vocals
Justin Foley – drums
Production
Lex Halaby – director, photography
Drew Lavyne – mastering
Adam Dutkiewicz - mixing
Chris Fortin – engineer
Wayne Krupa – engineer

Charts

Certifications

Special features and trivia
 All of the band's music videos up to The End of Heartache (2004).
 "From The Bedroom To The Basement" – an 85-minute documentary on the rise of the band. Includes commentary from such people as Brian Fair from Shadows Fall, Randy Blythe from Lamb of God, Philip Labonte from All That Remains, Corey Taylor from Slipknot and Stone Sour, members of Unearth, In Flames, God Forbid, As I Lay Dying, Mastodon and many more.
 Also included is behind-the-scenes footage from the early days up through the history of the band's live shows until the summer 2005 tour.
 5 rabbit holes pop up at different times during the From the Bedroom to the Basement documentary. When the subtitles are activated, the letters "KSE" pop up at the bottom right corner of the screen at certain points. Pressing enter will lead to comical interviews about the fictional group "Mr. Robotron".

References

Killswitch Engage video albums
2005 video albums
Live video albums
Music video compilation albums
2005 live albums
2005 compilation albums
Roadrunner Records live albums
Roadrunner Records compilation albums
Roadrunner Records video albums